Muessel-Drewry Brewery is a historic brewery complex and National historic district located off the crossroads of Portage Road and Elwood Avenue in South Bend, St. Joseph County, Indiana.  It originally encompassed seven contributing buildings and two contributing structures, listed as a series of grain silos as one structure and a smoke stack as the other. It developed between about 1865 and 1949, and consists of a mix of industrial buildings that are made of period brick from their respective era, as well as pole barn outbuildings and a series of grain silos and a large smoke stack.  The buildings are associated with Christopher Muessel, a German immigrant, who was known for his forward thought in developing brewing technology and processes, and what later became Muessel Brewing Company, ran by Muessel's kin upon his passing until going out of business in 1933 as a product of not being able to survive as a non-alcoholic beverage company in the prohibition era in the United States.  The Muessel family was a significant contributor to the growth of what is now known as District 2 in South Bend.  In addition to the hundreds of homes that provided housing for staff, the family also contributed the largest park in the area, as well as a local school, both of which are still in existence today, Muessel Grove Park and Muessel Elementary School.  The family also was a local sponsor of South Bend's professional football team, the Muessel Brewers, which was coach by football legend and local hero Knute Rockne to an undefeated season while Rockne had an all-star senior year as Captain of the Football team at neighboring University of Notre Dame.

Post prohibition, Drewrys, a Canadian brewing company, purchased the site and resumed brewing.  From 1936 to early 1972 Drewry's operated as the largest distributor of any of the South Bend/Mishawaka breweries.  In June 1972, G. Heilman Brewing Company bought Drewry’s from its parent firm; and brewing at the South Bend plant ceased in September of that year.  The complex went through a series of owners since 1972 and was largely scrapped until it was purchased in late December 2014 by an Arizona based owner who purchased the site.

In 2016, the City of South Bend officials deemed several buildings to be structurally unsound and publicly stated that for 44 years the buildings ordered to come down have been unsafe.  Several of the structures ordered by the City to come down were part of the National Register of Historic Places.

In 2016, the owner commenced abatement which would become of one of the largest asbestos removals in the region and clearing the site of asbestos that had been left to deteriorate in condition by former owners.

In 2017 the owner completed the demolition required by City officials and the City released the demolition permit.

In 2019, the site has now been re-branded as Rockne Industrial Center and has been proposed for nutrient dense food cultivation by the current ownership.  The owner has proposed to the City to restore the history of the Muessel family in an outdoor mural on the section of the site that fronts the site and to work with Notre Dame to expand its presence back in the community in honor of one of their greatest football legends, Knute Rockne.

It still has several historic buildings (as the city counted multiple extensions of one building in their calculation of total buildings to come down), as well as 4 grain silos and the historic smoke stack, all of which have been deemed to be structurally sound.

Despite the owner's efforts, the City of South Bend has ordered the remaining structures to be down citing remaining brick from the original historic structures which is to be used in the reconstruction of the site.  The City reaffirmed a demolition order in June 2018 ordering the removal of all of the remaining historic structures and a newer building without any code violations citing a blanket to do so over the site.

The City has yet to provide any assistance in what the owner has stated is a mission to restore jobs to the community by returning industry to the site.

It was listed on the National Register of Historic Places in 2000.

References

Historic districts on the National Register of Historic Places in Indiana
Industrial buildings and structures on the National Register of Historic Places in Indiana
Historic districts in South Bend, Indiana
National Register of Historic Places in St. Joseph County, Indiana